Evesham Town Hall is a municipal structure in the Market Place in Evesham, Worcestershire, England. The town hall, which was the headquarters of Evesham Borough Council, is a Grade II listed building.

History

The first municipal building in Evesham was a medieval guildhall in Bridge Street close to the bridge across the River Avon. After the old guildhall fell into a state of disrepair, civic leaders briefly used the black and white timber-framed Round House (also known as the Booth Hall) in Bridge Street for their meetings until the town hall became available. Following the Dissolution of the Monasteries in the 1540s, the remains of Evesham Abbey, and much of the town to the north of the abbey, was acquired by the then Master of the Ordnance in the North, Sir Philip Hoby, in 1546. After Sir Philip Hoby's death in 1558, the abbey site passed to his nephew, Sir Edward Hoby, who decided to commission the town hall as a gift to the town.

The new building was designed in the neoclassical style, was built from rubble masonry recovered the ruins of the abbey and was completed in 1586. It was designed with arcading on the ground floor to allow markets to be held and with an assembly room on the first floor: a village lock-up for holding petty criminals and facilities for grain threshing were installed in the arcaded area at an early stage. A council chamber was installed on the first floor at the expense of two local members of parliament, John Rudge and Sir John Rushout, in 1728. After a programme of repair works was completed in 1834, the town was advanced to the status of municipal borough with the town hall as its headquarters in 1835.

The building was substantially remodelled to a design by George Hunt to commemorate the Golden Jubilee of Queen Victoria in 1887. The design involved a symmetrical main frontage with two bays facing north onto the Market Square; the ground floor consisted of two stone arches while the first floor featured a large oriel window; above the window was a gable containing a trefoil surrounded by the inscriptions "V.R." (Victoria Regina) and "A.D. 1887" and displaying a coat of arms at its centre. A clock tower with a lantern and finial was erected at roof level. Internally, the principal rooms were the main hall and the council chamber. A wind indicator, a barometer and a thermometer were presented the Reverend George Head, the priest in charge of St Mary's Church at Aston Somerville, and installed on the north face of the building in November 1887.

The town hall continued to serve as the headquarters of the borough for much of the 20th century but ceased to be the local seat of government after the enlarged Wychavon District Council was formed in 1974. In April 1995, the building was acquired by Evesham Town Council which arranged the restoration of the clock tower in 1998, the refurbishment of the weather instruments in 2000, and tenancies for the ground floor so that the area could be used as a café bar.

Works of art in the town hall include a series of paintings by the artist, George Willis-Pryce, depicting the Workman Bridge across the River Avon, the ferry to the village of Little Hampton, and the old gateway to the Market Square.

References

Government buildings completed in 1586
City and town halls in Worcestershire
Evesham
Grade II listed buildings in Worcestershire